Henry William Stokes (November 17, 1871 – February 6, 1966) was an American farmer, businessman, and politician.

Born in the town of Portland, Dodge County, Wisconsin, Stokes went to public schools and to the Waterloo High School in Waterloo, Wisconsin. Stokes owned a farm in the town of Waterloo, Jefferson County, Wisconsin. He was on the board of directors of the Waterloo Canning Company and was involved with the Waterloo Farmers Association. Stokes worked for J. L. Owens Threshing Machine Company of Minneapolis, Minnesota and National Wool Growers Association. Stokes served as Waterloo Town Treasurer and on the Jefferson County Board of Supervisors. Stokes also served on the school board. In 1921 and 1925, Stokes served in the Wisconsin State Assembly and was a Republican. Stokes died in a nursing home in Waterloo, Wisconsin.

Notes

1871 births
1966 deaths
People from Portland, Dodge County, Wisconsin
People from Waterloo, Wisconsin
Businesspeople from Wisconsin
Farmers from Wisconsin
County supervisors in Wisconsin
School board members in Wisconsin
Republican Party members of the Wisconsin State Assembly
Leaders of the American Society of Equity